Polymetme is a genus of lightfishes.

Species
There are currently six recognized species in this genus:
 Polymetme andriashevi Parin & Borodulina, 1990
 Polymetme corythaeola (Alcock, 1898) (Rendezvous fish)
 Polymetme elongata (Matsubara, 1938)
 Polymetme illustris McCulloch, 1926 (Brilliant lightfish)
 Polymetme surugaensis (Matsubara, 1943) (Suruga lightfish)
 Polymetme thaeocoryla Parin & Borodulina, 1990

References

Phosichthyidae
Taxa named by Allan Riverstone McCulloch
Marine fish genera